The Aleut Corporation, or TAC, is one of thirteen Alaska Native Regional Corporations created under the Alaska Native Claims Settlement Act of 1971 (ANCSA) in settlement of aboriginal land claims. The Aleut Corporation was incorporated in Alaska on June 21, 1972.  Headquartered in Anchorage, Alaska, The Aleut Corporation is a for-profit corporation with approximately 3,410 Alaska Native shareholders, primarily of Aleut descent originating in the Alaska Peninsula, Aleutian Islands, Pribilof Islands, and Shumagin Islands of Alaska.

Under ANCSA, The Aleut Corporation received a settlement of $19.5 million. Its land entitlement included 66,000 acres (270 km²) of surface lands and 1.572 million acres (6,362 km²) of subsurface estate.

Officers and directors
A current listing of The Aleut Corporations' officers and directors, as well as documents filed with the State of Alaska since TAC's incorporation, are available online through the Corporations Database of the Division of Corporations, Business & Professional Licensing, Alaska Department of Commerce, Community and Economic Development.

Shareholders
At incorporation, The Aleut Corporation enrolled 3,249 Alaska Native shareholders, each of whom received 100 shares of TAC stock. As an ANCSA corporation, TAC has no publicly traded stock and its shares cannot legally be sold.

Lands
Under ANCSA, The Aleut Corporation was entitled to 66,000 acres (270 km²) of surface lands and 1.572 million acres (6,362 km²) of subsurface estate. Most of TAC's land selections were made on the
Alaska Peninsula and in the Aleutian Islands, Shumagin Islands, and Pribilof Islands.

Enterprises
TAC's primary business areas are in the areas of government contracting, telecommunications, environmental remediation, real estate management, trust management, sales of sand, gravel, mineral, and rock aggregates, and investments in oil and gas producing properties and marketable securities. Under federal law, The Aleut Corporation and its majority-owned subsidiaries, joint ventures and partnerships are deemed to be "minority and economically disadvantaged business enterprise[s]". This family of businesses is exempt from the Civil Rights Act of 1964, meaning their employment policies are allowed to be discriminatory.(43 USC 1626(e)).

Citations

References
 Corporations database. The Aleut Corporation. Division of Corporations, Business & Professional Licensing, Alaska Department of Commerce, Community and Economic Development. Retrieved on 2007-03-18.
 The Aleut Corporation. (2007). Annual Report 2006 — The Aleut Corporation: Honoring Our Traditional Ways. Anchorage, AK: The Aleut Corporation. Retrieved on 2007-03-26.

External links
 The Aleut Corporation (official website).
 Aleut Enterprise LLC
 ALEUT Management Services, LLC
 Alaska Trust Company
 Ki, LLC
 Akima Corporation
 The Aleut Foundation

1972 establishments in Alaska
Alaska Native regional corporations
Aleut
Companies based in Anchorage, Alaska